The Institute of Oriental Studies of the Russian Academy of Sciences, formerly Institute of Oriental Studies of the USSR Academy of Sciences, is a Russian research institution for the study of the countries and cultures of Asia and North Africa. The institute is located in Moscow, and formerly in Saint Petersburg, but in 2007 the Saint Petersburg branch was reorganized into a separate Institute of Oriental Manuscripts.

History
The Institute of Oriental Studies of the Russian Academy of Sciences (RAS) history began in 1818, when an Asiatic Museum under the Imperial Academy of Sciences was set up in St. Petersburg. It was a depository of oriental manuscripts, a museum with exposition for visitors, a scientific and organizing center for oriental studies as well as a library for academic research.

At the beginning of the 20th century, by the 100th anniversary of its foundation, the Asian Museum became a major Oriental center with a  collection of manuscripts in 45 oriental languages and a library. In 1929-30 the Oriental Department of the Academy of Sciences was reorganized, and the Institute of Oriental Studies was created on the basis of the Museum under the Academy of Sciences of the USSR. In 1950 the institute was transferred to Moscow.

Under Soviet leadership, the institute was tasked with political work as well as basic research. For example, the program for 1953 included "unmasking the colonial policy of imperialism" and opposing "the lying falsifications of bourgeois Orientalists, and of humanity-hating race 'theories'."

In 2005, the RAS separated the IOS from its St. Petersburg branch, giving the latter independent status as the Institute of Eastern Manuscripts.

In 2013, the Russian government transferred control of the IOS, together with all other RAS academic institutes, to a government agency  (FASO). In 2018, Vladimir Putin's greeting to the IOS 200th anniversary celebration noted the importance of its "providing expert support for foreign policy decisions and promoting Russia's strategic interests."

Now, the Institute of Oriental Studies of the Russian Academy of Sciences is a research center where history and culture, economics and politics, languages and literature of the countries of Asia and North Africa are studied. The chronology covers all periods of the history of the Orient - from antiquity to the present day. About 500 experts work there.

Most scientific centers and departments of the institute conduct research on certain countries and regions (e.g., Center for Arab Studies, Center for Japanese Studies, Center for Indian Studies, etc.). Some departments conduct research on problems of the Orient (in particular, the Center for Energy and Transport Studies, etc.).

The institute's depositories contain ancient books and manuscripts, exceeding one million volumes.

Conferences of the institute include: 
 Rerikhovskie chteniya (Roerich's Readings), on historical, cultural and religious problems of countries of Central Asia and the Indian subcontinent, 
 Problems of modern Iran, 
 The society and state in China, 
 Annual conference of Arabists, 
 Australia and Oceania: history and modernity, 
 Russia and the Orient: problems of interaction, 
 In 2004 the Institute of Oriental Studies organized the International Congress of Asian and North African Studies (ICANAS XXXVII).

The institute develops contacts with the Indian Council for Social Sciences Researches and with some universities of India, with the International Association for Mongol Studies as well as with the scientific and non-governmental organization of Arab countries (e.g. ALECSO).

Institute publishing includes the following:
 Southeast Asia: current problems of development, 
 Eastern Archives, 
 Epigraphics of the Orient, 
  Japan, Altaica and Irano-Slavica. 
 Vostok/Oriens for specialists, 
 The magazine Asia and Africa Today for the general public, 
 Institute of Africa of the RAS.

The institute founded the Oriental University (www.orun.ru), which trains experts in regional studies and orientalists for scientific and teaching work, public service, to work at international organizations and commercial enterprises, etc. The programs of training, textbooks and original methods have been worked out by the scholars of the Institute of Oriental Studies.

Internet journal New Eastern Outlook

According to its website, this journal primarily focuses on the region from "Japan and the remote coasts of Africa" but also examines events elsewhere "as they relate to the Orient." In 2019, Kevin Poulsen in The Daily Beast accused it of being a source of Russian propaganda and fake news.

In 2017, Politico published the titles of some article appearing in New Eastern Outlook:
 "Ukraine’s Ku Klux Klan — NATO’s New Ally."
 "Proof: Turkey Did 2013 Sarin Attack and Did This One Too"
 If NATO wants peace and stability it should stay home" and
 "Brussels, NATO and the Globalists in Total Disarray."

According to the United States Department of State (2020), the journal is a "pillar of Russia's disinformation and propaganda system", which "promotes disinformation and propaganda focused primarily on the Middle East, Asia, and Africa....while also obscuring its links to state-funded institutions."

Articles from New Eastern Outlook have been published by the American conspiracy site Veterans Today, a partnership which began in 2013.

Partnerships and collaborations
Partnerships in international programs of scientific cooperation, research projects and publishing programs, representation in academic institutions of near and distant foreign countries, participation in international expeditions, conferences and seminars, teaching activity abroad in the sphere of Orientalism, training courses of members of the Institute at foreign universities and visits of trainers from abroad, membership in international Oriental associations and in societies of business, cultural and humanitarian cooperation.

There are scientific contacts with Turkey, India, Egypt, Japan, Iran, and China.

Institute research topics have included:
 "Comprehensive study of ethnogenesis, ethnic and cultural image of the people, contemporary ethnic processes, historical and cultural cooperation in Eurasia", 
 "Studying the historical roots of terrorism, monitoring of xenophobia and extremism in Russian society, anthropology of extreme groups and subcultures, an analysis of the complex ethnic and religious factors in the local and global processes of the past and present",
 "Problems of the theory of historical process, summarizing the experience of social transformation and social potential of the history", 
 "The evolution of human societies and civilizations: the man in the history and the history of everyday life. Retrospective analysis of forms and contents of relations between the authorities and society", 
 "Study of the spiritual and aesthetic values of national and world literature and folklore", 
 "Genesis and the interaction of social, cultural and linguistic communities", 
 "The historical experience of social transformation and conflict".

Structure
 
 Department of Israel
 Department of the History of the Orient
 Department of the History and Culture of the Ancient Orient
 Department of China
 Department of the Problems of International Relations
 Department of Korea and Mongolia
 Department of Asian Literatures
 Department of Monuments of Oriental Writing
 Department of Comparative Theoretical Studies
 Department of Comparative Culture Studies
 Department of Near and Middle East
 Department of CIS Countries
 Department of Southeast Asian Studies
 Department of Economics Research
 Department of South Pacific Research
 Asian Languages Department
 Center for Arabic and Islamic Studies
 Center for Indian Studies
 Center for Japanese Studies

See also
Govhar Bakhshaliyeva
Moscow Institute of Oriental Studies, that operated 1920-1954

References

External links
 Institute of Oriental Studies - Official site 
 Saint Petersburg Institute of Oriental Manuscripts - Official site (English) - former St Petersburg branch of the Institute of Oriental Studies
 New Eastern Outlook - Online journal published by the Institute

Asian studies
Research institutes in Russia
Research institutes in the Soviet Union
Institutes of the Russian Academy of Sciences